Gaston Briart was a Belgian geologist and mining engineer who worked and studied rock formations at Prince Léopold mine, Kipushi, Katanga, Democratic Republic of the Congo.

The mineral Briartite, discovered in Kipushi in 1965, is named in his honour.

See also
 Paul Fourmarier
 Jean de Heinzelin de Braucourt
 William van Leckwijck

References
J.J. Lhoest, Famous mineral localities: The Kipushi mine, Zaire in Mineralogical Record volume 26, Number 3: May–June 1995 p. 163

External links
Prince Léopold Mine

Belgian mining engineers
Belgian geologists